Antoine-Jacques Roustan (23 October 1734 – 15 June 1808) was a Genevan pastor and theologian, who engaged in an extensive correspondence with Jean-Jacques Rousseau.
Unlike Rousseau, he believed that a Christian republic was practical - that the Christian religion was not incompatible with patriotism or republicanism.

Life
Roustan was born on 23 October 1734 in Geneva, the son of Jacques Roustan, a Protestant shoemaker and Marie Baile.
He studied theology at Geneva, and was ordained a minister in 1759.
In 1761 he married Jeanne-Françoise, daughter of Justus Saint-Andre, a barber.
He was a schoolteacher and minister of St. Evangile in Geneva from 1761–1764, when he became pastor of the Swiss Church of London (1764–1791).
In 1791 he became a "bourgeois" (gentleman) of Geneva, and in 1792 became a pastor in Geneva, and from 1797-1798 he was a headmaster.
He was elected a Member of the Council of Two Hundred in 1793.
Roustan and his friend the Rev. Jacob Vernes wrote a History of Geneva, which remained in manuscript form.
He published several books on Christianity and Deism.

Correspondence with Rousseau
Roustan exchanged many letters with Rousseau between 1757 and 1767.
In his first letter of March 1757 he compared Rousseau to Socrates.  Rousseau praised him in return, but, although polite about the poetry he had sent, advised him against seeking a career as a man of letters.
Roustan wrote to Rousseau after reading Julie, or the New Heloise (1761) saying that although he found the novel delightful, he was concerned that it was immoral in describing adulterous love so vividly and in describing hope as the only reason to believe in Christianity.
He visited Rousseau in Môtiers in 1762 and welcomed in him in London in 1766, but retained his views on the compatibility between Christianity and patriotism.

Four of his works – Défense du christianisme considéré du côté politique, wherein he refuted some of Rousseau's arguments from On the Social Contract; Discours sur les moyens de réformer les mœurs; Examen des quatre beaux siècles de Voltaire; and Dialogue entre Brutus et César aux Champs Élysées – were collected and published in 1764 under the title Offrande aux autels et à la patrie.
The rebuttal in Défense du Christianisme ou réfutation du chapitre VIII du Contrat Social is friendly, and in fact Rousseau approved of his work and helped him with finding a publisher. In it Roustan implied that Rousseau may not himself have believed in his stated view that the scriptures preach servitude and resignation, and went on to say that doing good works was an integral part of the religion, including fighting for freedom and against tyranny. He therefore felt that Christianity and Republicanism or patriotism were fully compatible.

In 1776 Roustan published a rebuttal to Rousseau's Profession of Faith of a Savoyard Vicar in Emile: or, On Education.
His Examen critique de la seconde partie de la "profession de foi du Vicaire Savoyard" was one of the main reasons that Rousseau was mocked by Voltaire in Voltaire's Remontrances des pasteurs du Gévaudan.

Bibliography

Footnotes

References

Sources

 

 
 
 
 
 

1734 births
1808 deaths
Theologians from the Republic of Geneva
Philosophers from the Republic of Geneva
18th-century clergy from the Republic of Geneva
Calvinist and Reformed ministers
Calvinist and Reformed theologians
18th-century Calvinist and Reformed theologians